The Dire Wraiths are a fictional extraterrestrial species appearing in American comic books published by Marvel Comics and IDW Publishing. The Dire Wraiths are the main opponents of Rom the Spaceknight.

Publication history
The Dire Wraiths first appeared in Rom #1 (1979) and were created by Bill Mantlo and Al Milgrom. Parker Brothers created the term Dire Wraiths to promote the original ROM toy, but Marvel developed all of the backstory and art behind them. Hasbro has since taken over ownership and trademarked the name. IDW Publishing developed a new appearance and backstory distinct from what had been previously created by Marvel, who still owns those aspects.

Fictional species biography

Marvel Universe
The Dire Wraiths are an evolutionary offshoot of the Skrulls from the Andromeda Galaxy. Like the Skrulls, the Wraiths are shapeshifters, able to take the forms of other creatures. The Wraiths were originally depicted as amorphous, cloudy, vaguely humanoid-shaped beings, but was eventually revealed that it was a transitional form used for shapeshifting and that their true form is entirely different. The Dire Wraiths are Skrullian Deviants engineered by the starfaring Celestials. The Wraiths have both reptilian and mammal-like traits. The females lay eggs and lactate.

In-universe, most characters consider Wraiths to be sexually dimorphic, but it is stated within the comics that all Wraiths actually have the same form, but the males are so ashamed of their true form that they use their shapeshifting abilities to constantly appear in their transitory forms. The basic transitory form is stocky and troll-like in appearance, with red or brown skin, but otherwise roughly human-like in size and shape. The true form has an obese, reddish body with large, pupil-less eyes, small beaks, 'hands' that resemble small pincers and tentacles; clawed feet, and thick tails. They also have long, drill-like tongues, that they use to suck out the brains of their victims, allowing them to gain their memories. All Wraiths can copy the appearance of other beings without consuming their brains or killing them.

Wraiths turned into dust when killed (or banished to Limbo).

In-universe origins

At some point in their history, female Dire Wraiths began to study evil magic. This caused a rift with their parent race, the Skrulls, and they were driven out of the Andromeda Galaxy. They settled on the planet Wraithworld.

The Dark Nebula
Two hundred years before the events of the main comic strip, the Dire Wraiths launched an offensive on Galador and the galaxy in which it was located. However, upon arriving at Galador they found out that hundreds of young Galadorians had been transformed into cyborg warriors called Spaceknights, who repelled the attack. The Dire Wraiths returned to Wraithworld, only to have Rom, the greatest of the Spaceknights, follow them there, intent on wiping them from the universe. Realizing that other Spaceknights would soon follow, the Wraiths decided to abandon Wraithworld, and scattered across the universe.

Wraiths on Earth

Several decades prior to Rom's arrival on Earth, a large group of Wraiths landed near a small town in West Virginia. The Wraiths infiltrated the town in human form, and later, began to infiltrate governments and other important organizations across the world. Because Dire Wraith magic was fueled by the black sun of Wraithworld in the Dark Nebula, their ability to perform magic on Earth was severely crippled. Consequently, the male-dominated technology faction of the Wraiths was in control.

Later, Rom landed near Clairton, having detected a Wraith infestation, and with the help of some of the locals, eventually succeeded in banishing all the Wraiths there. Then he proceeded to travel around the world, looking for the rest, eventually leaving the protection of Clairton to the human superhero, the Torpedo.

Eventually, the female-dominated faction of magically-oriented Wraiths, blaming the technology faction for failing to defeat Rom, launched a coup and then proceeded to attack the Earth openly. Their first act was to kill the entire population of Clairton while Rom was away. Later, they then openly attacked S.H.I.E.L.D. at their headquarters, the Helicarrier. This proved a major blunder in that the personnel were able to repel the attack and all doubt by the authorities as to the existence and threat of the alien species was removed.

Soon afterwards, the Wraiths launched a plan to help them conquer Earth once and for all; they cast a spell on Earth's Sun, allowing them to use its energies to draw Wraithworld into Earth's Solar System. This greatly increased their magical powers. Emboldened, the Wraiths made a mass attack on New York City, where they clashed with dozens of the city's superheroes. However, thanks to Rom, who used a special satellite to boost the power of his Neutralizer, Wraithworld in its entirety was banished into Limbo, causing all Wraiths in this galaxy to lose their powers, including, apparently, their shapeshifting abilities. Subsequently, Rom banishes all the defeated Wraiths into Limbo.

The Wraith Queen, Volx, later made appearances in issues of New Warriors (vol. 1) and Nova (vol. 2). It was later confirmed that this is the same Wraith queen introduced in Rom (vol. 1) #48.

Return of the Wraiths
A salvaged Dire Wraith ship is used as a Moscow headquarters for the Russian superheroes of the Winter Guard. Fantasma was revealed to have been a Dire Wraith Queen in Darkstar & the Winter Guard #2.

In the 2011 Annihilators miniseries, a team of Skrulls try to bring back Wraithworld and its population, intending to empower them and use them as a weapon to reform the Skrull Empire. The Wraith's Queen Volx and the Galadorians both are manipulated into setting this up, and the Annihilators find that Wraithworld has to be brought back to reality to balance out the unleashed Dark Sun. The Silver Surfer discovers that Volx has actually been driven insane by an empathic link to Wraithworld in Limbo. When the Annihilators arrive there, the team is horrified to find out that after generations in Limbo, the surviving Dire Wraiths are a disease-ridden, half-starved people in constant anguish and most of them are suicidal.

The Dire Wraiths later appear as a member of the Universal Inhumans alongside the Badoon, Centaurians, and the Kymellians.

Standalone comic series

The Dire Wraiths received their own comic book series, which has received mixed reviews. While the characterization of the comic was praised, its cartoonish art style was heavily criticized.

Dire Wraith characters
The following lists some of the more notable Dire Wraith characters:
 Avoe – queen of the Dire Wraiths and member of the Universal Inhumans.
 Doctor Dredd – rare male Dire Wraith warlock.
 Hooud – a size-shifting Dire Wraith who is a member of the Universal Inhumans' Light Brigade. He operates under the alias of Creeping Death.
 Hybrid / Jimmy Marks – first hybrid offspring of a human and Dire Wraith.
 Kattan-Tu – Dire Wraith orphan who was raised by the Sarkans, a childless human couple, that named him Jimmy .
 Voorr – a Dire Wraith who is a member of the Universal Inhumans' Light Brigade. He operates under the alias of Sun'''. Voorr can fly and project force fields.

Reception
The Dire Wraith's have been criticized as being "evil for evil's sake" and as having a thin motivation for their actions.

Further reading
 The Slings & Arrows Comic Guide'' by Tim Pilcher and Frank Plowright p. 266, Aurum Press (1997)
 ""Marvel Comics Abandons Trademark Challenge Against Hasbro Over "Dire Wraiths"" by Rich Johnston, BleedingCool.com (2017)
 "Pick of the Week: "Rom: Dire Wraiths" #1" by Jonathan O'Neal, Multiversity Comics (2020)

References

External links
 Dire Wraith entry on MarvelDirectory.com
 Dire Wraith information from Rom Spaceknight Revisited 
 
 Dire Wraith at Marvel Wiki

Characters created by Al Milgrom
Characters created by Bill Mantlo
Hasbro characters
Marvel Comics characters with superhuman strength
Marvel Comics characters who are shapeshifters
Marvel Comics characters who use magic
Marvel Comics extraterrestrial supervillains
Marvel Comics supervillains
Rom the Space Knight
Marvel Comics Deviants
Fiction set in the Andromeda Galaxy